Total Balalaika Show – Helsinki Concert is a 1993 live concert album by the Leningrad Cowboys and the Alexandrov Ensemble. It  was recorded at Senate Square, Helsinki on 12 June 1993. This concert was also documented on film by Aki Kaurismäki.

Track listing
The album of the concert featured more songs than in the film:

The Japanese release was only one disc and had a different cover.

References

Leningrad Cowboys albums
1993 live albums